Flag Racing is a rodeo and O-Mok-See event in which a horse and rider attempt to complete a pattern around preset barrels in the fastest time. The contest must deposit a flag in one bucket and remove a flag from another bucket. It is a youth rodeo event for both boys and girls.

Modern event 

The National Little Britches Rodeo has both a Little Wrangler (coed ages 5–8) Flag Racing competition and a Junior Boy (ages 9–13) Flag Racing competition.

Rules 

The rider is given a flag before the start of the race. The contestant must race toward the first barrel and place the flag in the bucket. Then the contestant must race to the second barrel and remove a flag from the second bucket. Finally, the rider must race back to the finish line.

The contestant will be disqualified for any of the following:

 Knocking over a bucket or barrel
 Dropping a flag
 Crossing the finish line without the flag from the second bucket.

References

External links
National Little Britches Rodeo Association
National High School Rodeo Association

Rodeo-affiliated events
Mounted games